We're Going Home may refer to:

 "We're Going Home", a song by Montrose from Paper Money (1974)
 "We're Going Home", a song by Vance Joy from Nation of Two (2018)